The internal structure of Earth is the solid portion of the Earth, excluding its atmosphere and hydrosphere. The structure consists of an outer silicate solid crust, a highly viscous asthenosphere and solid mantle, a liquid outer core whose flow generates the Earth's magnetic field, and a solid inner core.

Scientific understanding of the internal structure of Earth is based on observations of topography and bathymetry, observations of rock in outcrop, samples brought to the surface from greater depths by volcanoes or volcanic activity, analysis of the seismic waves that pass through Earth, measurements of the gravitational and magnetic fields of Earth, and experiments with crystalline solids at pressures and temperatures characteristic of Earth's deep interior.

Global properties

Measurements of the force exerted by Earth's gravity can be used to calculate its mass. Astronomers can also calculate Earth's mass by observing the motion of orbiting satellites. Earth's average density can be determined through gravimetric experiments, which have historically involved pendulums.

Layers
The structure of Earth can be defined in two ways: by mechanical properties such as rheology, or chemically. Mechanically, it can be divided into lithosphere, asthenosphere, mesospheric mantle, outer core, and the inner core. Chemically, Earth can be divided into the crust, upper mantle, lower mantle, outer core, and inner core. The geologic component layers of Earth are at increasing depths below the surface:

Crust and lithosphere 

The thin parts are the oceanic crust, which underlie the ocean basins (5–10 km) and is mafic-rich (dense iron-magnesium silicate mineral or igneous rock). The thicker crust is the continental crust, which is less dense and is felsic-rich (igneous rocks rich in elements that form feldspar and quartz). The rocks of the crust fall into two major categories – sial (aluminium silicate) and sima (magnesium silicate). It is estimated that sima starts about 11 km below the Conrad discontinuity, though the discontinuity is not distinct and can be absent in some continental regions.

The Earth's lithosphere consists of the crust and the uppermost mantle. The crust-mantle boundary occurs as two physically different phenomena. The Mohorovičić discontinuity is a distinct change of seismic wave velocity. This is caused by a change in the rock's density – Immediately above the Moho, the velocities of primary seismic waves (P wave) are consistent with those through basalt (6.7–7.2 km/s), and below they are similar to those through peridotite or dunite (7.6–8.6 km/s). Second, in oceanic crust, there is a chemical discontinuity between ultramafic cumulates and tectonized harzburgites, which has been observed from deep parts of the oceanic crust that have been obducted onto the continental crust and preserved as ophiolite sequences.

Many rocks making up Earth's crust formed less than 100 million years ago; however, the oldest known mineral grains are about 4.4 billion years old, indicating that Earth has had a solid crust for at least 4.4 billion years.

Mantle 

The mantle is divided into upper and lower mantle separated by a transition zone. The lowest part of the mantle next to the core-mantle boundary is known as the D″ (D-double-prime) layer. The pressure at the bottom of the mantle is ≈140 GPa (1.4 Matm). The mantle is composed of silicate rocks richer in iron and magnesium than the overlying crust. Although solid, the mantle's extremely hot silicate material can flow over very long timescales. Convection of the mantle propels the motion of the tectonic plates in the crust. The source of heat that drives this motion is the decay of radioactive isotopes in the Earth's crust and mantle combined with the initial heat from the planet's formation.

Due to increasing pressure deeper in the mantle, the lower part flows less easily, though chemical changes within the mantle may also be important. The viscosity of the mantle ranges between 1021 and 1024 pascal-second, increasing with depth.

Core 

Its outer boundary lies  beneath Earth's surface. The transition between the inner core and outer core is located approximately  beneath the Earth's surface. Earth's inner core is the innermost geologic layer of the planet Earth.

The inner core was discovered in 1936 by Inge Lehmann and is generally composed primarily of iron and some nickel. Since this layer is able to transmit shear waves (transverse seismic waves), it must be solid. Experimental evidence has at times been inconsistent with current crystal models of the core. Other experimental studies show a discrepancy under high pressure: diamond anvil (static) studies at core pressures yield melting temperatures that are approximately 2000 K below those from shock laser (dynamic) studies. The laser studies create plasma, and the results are suggestive that constraining inner core conditions will depend on whether the inner core is a solid or is a plasma with the density of a solid. This is an area of active research.

In early stages of Earth's formation about 4.6 billion years ago, melting would have caused denser substances to sink toward the center in a process called planetary differentiation (see also the iron catastrophe), while less-dense materials would have migrated to the crust. The core is thus believed to largely be composed of iron (80%), along with nickel and one or more light elements, whereas other dense elements, such as lead and uranium, either are too rare to be significant or tend to bind to lighter elements and thus remain in the crust (see felsic materials). Some have argued that the inner core may be in the form of a single iron crystal.

Under laboratory conditions a sample of iron–nickel alloy was subjected to the corelike pressures by gripping it in a vise between 2 diamond tips (diamond anvil cell), and then heating to approximately 4000 K. The sample was observed with x-rays, and strongly supported the theory that Earth's inner core was made of giant crystals running north to south.

The composition of the Earth bears strong similarities to that of certain chondrite meteorites, and even to some elements in the outer portion of the Sun. Beginning as early as 1940, scientists, including Francis Birch, built geophysics upon the premise that Earth is like ordinary chondrites, the most common type of meteorite observed impacting Earth. This ignores the less abundant enstatite chondrites, which formed under extremely limited available oxygen, leading to certain normally oxyphile elements existing either partially or wholly in the alloy portion that corresponds to the core of Earth.

Dynamo theory suggests that convection in the outer core, combined with the Coriolis effect, gives rise to Earth's magnetic field. The solid inner core is too hot to hold a permanent magnetic field (see Curie temperature) but probably acts to stabilize the magnetic field generated by the liquid outer core. The average magnetic field in Earth's outer core is estimated to measure , 50 times stronger than the magnetic field at the surface.

Seismology 

The layering of Earth has been inferred indirectly using the time of travel of refracted and reflected seismic waves created by earthquakes. The core does not allow shear waves to pass through it, while the speed of travel (seismic velocity) is different in other layers. The changes in seismic velocity between different layers causes refraction owing to Snell's law, like light bending as it passes through a prism. Likewise, reflections are caused by a large increase in seismic velocity and are similar to light reflecting from a mirror.

See also
 Hollow Earth
 Geological history of Earth
 Lehmann discontinuity
 Rain-out model
 Travel to the Earth's center
 Solid earth

References

Further reading

External links